For The Recently Found Innocent is the sixth studio album by American musician Tim Presley, who goes under the name White Fence. It was released in July 2014 under Drag City Records.

Track list

References

2014 albums
Tim Presley albums
Drag City (record label) albums